The fountain darter (Etheostoma fonticola) is a species of freshwater ray-finned fish, a darter from the subfamily Etheostomatinae, part of the family Percidae, which also contains the perches, ruffes and pikeperches. It is found in the headwaters of only two rivers in Texas, United States: the Comal River and the San Marcos River. It is a federally listed endangered species of the United States and is also listed as endangered by the IUCN.

Distribution and habitat
The fountain darter is known from only two locations, primarily the headwaters of the spring-fed San Marcos River, having been observed as far as 1.25 miles downstream,  as well as the upper reaches of the Comal River in central Texas. Its geographic isolation is reflective of its incredibly specific habitation preferences which demand conditions which can only be found in these two Texas river headwaters. In these unique locations they can be observed in open areas created by a medium current at depths of 3–5 feet near the outlets of contributing spring heads with rates of flow low enough to retain a layer of percolating sand. These springs can be found adjacent to the main springs that deliver the tremendous volumes of cool, perfectly clear water that forms each river. They require a stable water temperature, within the low 70s, year round which the springs provide. These two locations are uniquely suited habitat as these ecosystems’ diversity and ultra-high densities of plant and animal life are unparalleled, with quantities exponentially surpassing each and every ecosystem within the region and all surrounding regions.

Behavior
The fountain darter feeds on small invertebrates. It breeds all year round and the eggs are deposited on dead leaves, stems, rocks, algae or other objects. This fish lives for one to two 
years.

Status
They primarily occupy the sandy tops of lesser flowing springheads or flat rock surfaces absent of rooted plants, or decaying plant matter and spawn within the vibrantly abundant and healthy vegetation that thrives in these unique, pristine, springfed river systems. An extra worry for the future of fountain darters is the parasitic, non-native trematode (Centrocestus formosanus), whose impact on the darter population is not yet known. As of 2004, only the Comal population is seriously affected by the parasite. The National Fish Hatchery and Technology Center in San Marcos keeps a reserve population of 500 adults as a hedge against a man-made or natural event wiping out the fish in the wild. The IUCN rates this species as "Endangered". Conservation efforts include encouraging people to use less water in order to maximise water flow from the springs and to keep the rivers free from trash.

References

 
 

Etheostoma
Freshwater fish of the United States
Endemic fauna of Texas
ESA endangered species
Taxa named by David Starr Jordan
Taxa named by Charles Henry Gilbert
Fish described in 1886